Urban Tapestry is a three-woman band based in Toronto, Ontario that performs filk music, composed by Debbie Ridpath Ohi, Allison Durno, and Jodi Krangle. As a group, they won the 'Best Performer' Pegasus Award in both 1997 and 2004.

Urban Tapestry has released three albums between 1994 and 2003.

Discography
 Castles and Skyscrapers, 1994. Cover art by Ruth Ohi
 Myths and Urban Legends, Dodeka Records, 1997. Cover art by Beckett Gladney
 Sushi and High Tea, Dodeka Records, 2003. Cover art by Beckett Gladney

References

External links
 Urban Tapestry's official homepage

Urban Tapestry
Musical groups from Toronto
All-female bands